Tenison or Tennison is a surname. Notable people with the surname include:

Thomas Tenison (1636–1715), Archbishop of Canterbury
Renee Tenison (born 1968), American model and actress
Rosie Tenison (born 1968), American model and actress, identical twin sister of Renee Tenison
Jeni Tennison, OBE Technical Director of the Open Data Institute
Thomas Tenison, built Castle Tenison in 1820s, Keadue, Co. Roscommon, landowner, father of E.K. Tenison
Edward King-Tenison (1805–1878), lived at Kilronan Castle, Keadue, Co. Roscommon, Irish photographer, landowner
Lady Louisa Tenison, wife of E.K. Tenison, travel writer, and  artist
Henry King-Tenison, 8th Earl of Kingston (1848–1896), Irish peer and Conservative politician
Robin Hanbury-Tenison (born 1936), English explorer

Fictional characters:
Jane Tennison, chief character in the British TV series Prime Suspect

Media:
Prime Suspect 1973, a British TV show also known as Prime Suspect: Tennison or just Tennison

See also
Tennyson (disambiguation)